The first adhesive revenue stamps of Guatemala were issued in 1868 and preceded the first postage stamps of that country by three years.

Purposes
Guatemala has issued revenue stamps to collect documentary taxes, taxes on foreign bills and for other purposes. In addition, stamped paper had been in use since Spanish colonial times.

Gallery

See also
Postage stamps and postal history of Guatemala
1868-1900 Stamps of Guatemala on Wikimedia Commons

References

Philately of Guatemala
Economy of Guatemala
Guatemala